Richard Weston (by 1527 – 1572), of the Middle Temple, London and Roxwell, Essex, was an English politician.

Weston was a Member of the Parliament of England (MP) for Lostwithiel in March 1553, for Saltash in October 1553, for Maldon in 1555 and for Lancaster in November 1554.

References

1572 deaths
People from the City of Chelmsford
Members of the Middle Temple
Members of the Parliament of England for Lostwithiel
Year of birth uncertain
English MPs 1553 (Edward VI)
English MPs 1553 (Mary I)
English MPs 1554–1555
English MPs 1555
Serjeants-at-law (England)
Members of Parliament for Maldon
Members of the Parliament of England for Saltash
Members of the Parliament of England (pre-1707) for constituencies in Lancashire